Mahuyar is a 1976 Burmese black-and-white drama film, directed by Win Pe starring Htun Wai,  Kawleikgyin Ne Win, Kyaw Hein, Myint Myint Khin and San Shar Tin, Nwet Nwet Mu.

Cast
Htun Wai as U Ba Nyo
Kawleikgyin Ne Win as U Tin Maung
Kyaw Hein as Yan Aung
Myint Myint Khin as Daw Mi Mi Yee
San Shar Tin as Daw Tin Mi
Nwet Nwet Mu as Kyi Kyi Htun

References

1976 films
1970s Burmese-language films
Films shot in Myanmar
Burmese black-and-white films
1976 drama films
Burmese drama films